Devenish St Mary's is a Gaelic football club based in the village of Garrison, County Fermanagh, Northern Ireland.

History
The club was founded in 1917, but did not affiliate until 25 July 1926. The club won the Fermanagh Senior Football Championship for the first time in 1960 as Devenish/Mulleek, and went on to win the county title four more times in the 1960s, including a three in a row from 1965 to 1967. The club's tenth and most recent championship win came in 1996.

In 2017, the club's centenary year, the club reached its first county final since 1998. Devenish lost the final by seven points to Derrygonnelly.

Honours
 Fermanagh Senior Football Championship (10): 1960*, 1963, 1965, 1966, 1967, 1985, 1989, 1990, 1993, 1996
 Fermanagh Senior Football League (14): 1962, 1963, 1964, 1965, 1966, 1967, 1986, 1987, 1990, 1993, 1997, 2008, 2010, 2017
 Fermanagh Intermediate Football Championship (1): 2022
 Fermanagh Junior Football Championship (5): 1946, 1960, 1975, 1991, 2001

References

External links
 Devenish St Mary's Official Website

Gaelic football clubs in County Fermanagh
Gaelic games clubs in County Fermanagh